Reagan is an unincorporated community in Jackson Township, Clinton County, Indiana. Reagan was the name of a pioneer settler.

Geography

References

Unincorporated communities in Clinton County, Indiana